Allen & Ginter was a Richmond, Virginia, tobacco manufacturing company formed by John F. Allen and Lewis Ginter around 1880. The firm created and marketed the first cigarette cards for collecting and trading in the United States. Some of the notable cards in the series include baseball players Charles Comiskey, Cap Anson, and Jack Glasscock, as well as non-athletes like Buffalo Bill Cody.

The company merged with four other tobacco manufacturers to form the American Tobacco Company in 1890. Since 2006, a revived version of the brand has been issued by Topps for a line of baseball cards.

History

Tobacco manufacturing

The firm of Allen & Ginter, born around 1880, was the rebranding of John F. Allen & Company, a partnership formed about eight years earlier by John F. Allen and Lewis Ginter. When Allen retired in 1882, Ginter took on John Pope as his new partner but kept Allen's name. The first tobacco company to employ female labor, by 1886 they had 1,100 employees, predominantly girls, who rolled the cigarettes.

Around 1876, the company offered a prize for the invention of a machine able to roll cigarettes (which until then had been hand-rolled). In 1880, James Albert Bonsack of Virginia invented a cigarette rolling machine. Because it was not completely reliable, all but one of the large tobacco manufacturers declined to buy the machine. James Buchanan Duke did buy this cigarette rolling machine in 1885 and used it to great success; by 1890 he had consolidated his four major competitors, including Allen & Ginter, and formed the American Tobacco Company. The "Allen & Ginter Company" was no more, but Lewis Ginter sat on the board of the American Tobacco Company.

The cigarette brands of Allen & Ginter included Richmond Gems, Virginia Brights, Perfection, Dandies and Little Beauties.

In 1890, Allen & Ginter, along with other companies of the United States (W. Duke & Sons, W.S. Kimball & Company, Kinney Tobacco, and Goodwin & Company) formed the American Tobacco Company, in an attempt to compete against British tobacco companies.

Collectible cards
In late 1880s, Allen & Ginter began to release cigarette card sets as promotional items for its cigarette brands. The most part of the collection consisted of illustrated cards, but there were a few collections of photographs. Topics varied from birds and wild animals to American Indian chiefs or flags of the world. Allen & Ginter's baseball cards were the first of the tobacco era baseball cards ever produced for distribution on a national level. The most popular and highly sought after of these sets is the N28 and N29 "World's Champions" series, released in 1887.

Modern era

In 2006, Topps, a leading producer of confectionery and trading cards, resurrected the Allen & Ginter brand name to produce a series of illustrated trading cards, mostly focused on baseball sets. Nevertheless, the first couple of years of the product's inception saw the inclusion of several other sports figures such as Jennie Finch (softball), Brandi Chastain and Mia Hamm (soccer), Hulk Hogan (wrestling), Danica Patrick (auto racing), Leon Spinks (boxing), Randy Couture (mixed martial arts), Misty May-Treanor (beach volleyball) and Dennis Rodman (basketball).

Allen & Ginter cards began to feature hand-painted cards of current baseball players as well as various insert sets featuring standout athletes in other sports, pop culture icons, and historical figures ranging from Wee-Man to Davy Crockett and everything in between.

Non-sports trading cards issued by Topps included personalities such as Robert E. Lee, Thomas Edison, Billy the Kid and Andrew Carnegie, Davy Crockett, among others.

From 2006 to 2009, artist Dick Perez was commissioned to hand paint special one of one insert cards in the style of Allen & Ginter. Perez created 30 art cards each of those years featuring the prominent stars of the game.

As of 2012 the Allen & Ginter series remains one of Topps' most popular, highest selling brands in their product lineup.

The best known of the Allen & Ginter insert sets however, are the DNA Hair Relic cards. These highly lauded cards feature strands of hair from famous historical figures such as Abraham Lincoln, King George III, George Washington and many others.

Another popular feature of the Allen & Ginter product is the Rip Card. Invented by hobby shop owner and Topps consultant Alan Narz, Rip Cards have been a part of every Allen & Ginter product since 2006. These cards allow collectors to keep the card intact or to rip the outer card to reveal an exclusive mini card available only inside of a Rip Card. These mini cards may be short prints, autographs, or cards made from metal or wood. Beginning in 2013, Topps began including a Double Rip Card, which had two inner cavities with mini cards inside. In 2019, Topps introduced a jumbo Box Topper Rip Card, with 3 mini cards inside.

Trading cards series
There were various cigarette card sets released as promotional items for these products. The most popular and highly sought after of these sets is the N28 and N29 "World's Champions" series, released in 1887.

Some of the series released were (all illustrations, except where noted):

 A25: World's Inventors
 N1: American Editors 
 N2: American Indian Chiefs 
 N3: Arms of All Nations  
 N4: Birds of America 
 N5: Birds of the Tropics
 N6: City Flags 
 N8: 50 Fish From American Waters
 N9: Flags of All Nations
 N10: Flags of All Nations 2
 N11: Flags of the States and Territories
 N12: Fruits
 N13: Game birds
 N14: General Government and State Capitol Buildings
 N15: Great Generals
 N16: Natives in Costumes
 N17: Naval Flags 
 N18: Parasol Drills
 N19: Pirates of the Spanish
 N21: 50 Quadrupeds
 N22: Racing Colors of the World 
 N23: Song Birds of the World
 N24: Types of All Nations
 N25: Wild Animals of the World 
 N26: World's Beauties 
 N27: World's Beauties 2 
 N28: World's Champions
 N29: World's Champions 2
 N30: World's Decorations
 N31: World's Dudes
 N32: World's Racers
 N33: World's Smokers
 N34: World's Sovereigns
 N35: American Editors 2
 N36: American Indian Chiefs 2
 N37: Birds of America 2
 N38: Birds of the Tropics 2
 N40: Game Birds
 N42: Song Birds of the World
 N43: World's Champions 2
 N45: Actors and Actresses 
 N46: Cigarette Making Girls
 N47: Dogs 1
 N48: Girl Baseball Players 
 N49: Girl Cyclists 
 N57: Actresses 
 N58: Girls and Children 
 N59: Girls 
 N60: Actresses and Celebrities 
 N64: Girls and Children 
 N65: Girls and Children 
 N67: Actresses 2 

Notes

Further reading 
Enstad, Nan. Cigarettes, Inc.: An Intimate History of Corporate Imperialism. University of Chicago Press, 2018.
Robert Sobel The Entrepreneurs: Explorations Within the American Business Tradition (Weybright & Talley 1974), chapter 5, James Buchanan Duke: Opportunism Is the Spur .

References

External links

 Allen & Ginter collections on Topps
 Topps Allen & Ginter collection on Cardboardconnection
 Allen & Ginter collector's site (archived, 16 June 2021)

1880s establishments in Virginia
1890 disestablishments in Virginia
Companies established in the 1880s
Manufacturing companies established in the 19th century
Manufacturing companies disestablished in 1890
American companies disestablished in 1890
1890 mergers and acquisitions
American Tobacco Company
Tobacco companies of the United States
Manufacturing companies based in Richmond, Virginia
Baseball cards
Trading card companies
Defunct manufacturing companies based in Virginia